The dead side-blotched lizard (Uta lowei) is a species of lizard. Its range is in Mexico. The specific name, lowei, is in honor of American herpetologist Charles Herbert Lowe.

References 

Uta
Reptiles of Mexico
Reptiles described in 1994
Taxa named by Larry Lee Grismer